Empire City was a  cargo ship which was built in 1943 by William Doxford & Sons Ltd, Sunderland for the Ministry of War Transport (MoWT).

Description
Empire City was built by William Doxford & Sons Ltd, Sunderland. She was launched on 15 July 1943.

She had a GRT of 7,295 and a NRT of 4,941.

The ship was propelled by a 2-stroke Single Cycle Single Action diesel engine, which had eight cylinders of   diameter by  stroke.

History
Empire City was built for the MoWT. She was placed under the management of the A Weir & Co Ltd. Her port of registry was Sunderland. The Code Letters BFLB and the United Kingdom Official Number 180046 were allocated.

Empire City was a member of a number of convoys in the Second World War.

ON 212
Convoy ON 212 departed Liverpool on 19 November 1943 and arrived at New York on 5 December. Empire City had departed from Milford Haven, Pembrokeshire on 18 November. She was equipped with anti-torpedo nets on this voyage.

DKA 21
Empire City was a member of Convoy DKA 21, which departed Lourenço Marques, Portuguese East Africa bound for Port Said, Egypt via Aden. Empire City was carrying a cargo of 8,403 tons of coal. Two crew (Engineers) were killed. The surviving 48 crew and 20 DEMS gunners were rescued. They were landed at Pekawi, Portuguese East Africa. U-198 was sunk on 12 August. Those lost on Empire City are commemorated at the Tower Hill Memorial, London.

References

1943 ships
Ships built on the River Wear
Empire ships
Ministry of War Transport ships
Steamships of the United Kingdom
Ships sunk by German submarines in World War II
World War II shipwrecks in the Indian Ocean
Maritime incidents in August 1944